Jeanne Perego (born 1958) is an Italian writer and journalist.
She writes books for kids and teenagers, art, green and cultural tourism. She has worked for many Italian newspapers and magazines, like Il tirreno,  L'Eco di Bergamo, La Provincia di Como/Weekend, Topolino, Madre,  Carnet, Dove e Giardinaggio. She lives in Toscana half part of the year, and the other half in Bavaria.

She is known internationally being the author of Joseph and chico, an original biography of Pope Benedict XVI. Translated in 13 languages, it's a collection of stories about the life of Joseph Ratzinger, his origins, and his commitment to study and work. It is an original biography because the narrator is Chico, the cat owned by Joseph Ratzinger's neighbours in Pentling, bavaria. The introduction was written by Georg Ganswein, private secretary of Benedict XVI. The book was translated in 13 languages, from English to polish, including Monegasque.

In a second book, Max & Benedict, it is a lonely sparrow that lives on the vatican walls that narrates the everyday life of the successor of Saint Peter. This book was also translated in other languages, like English and Norwegian.

References

1958 births
Living people
Italian children's writers
Italian non-fiction writers
Italian women writers
Italian women children's writers